Norris is an unincorporated community in northeastern Madison County, Montana, United States, at the intersection of U.S. Route 287 and Montana Highway 84. The location is a hilly, relatively arid area used for farming and ranching; the Tobacco Root Mountains form a visual backdrop to the west.

Several mining districts were located in the area in the 1860s, though their success was generally brief. A now-abandoned branchline of the former Northern Pacific Railway once terminated at Norris.

Norris Hot Springs is just east of the town, and an agricultural experiment station operated by Montana State University - Bozeman is at Red Bluff, approximately three miles east on Highway 84.

Demographics

References

Unincorporated communities in Madison County, Montana
Unincorporated communities in Montana